Pierre Monier  or Mosnier (17 May 1641 – 29 December 1703) was a French painter.

Mosnier was born in Blois. His father Jean Monier was also painter, and was his first teacher. In 1664 he won the inaugural Prix de Rome for his painting la Conquête de la Toison d’Or (the Conquest of the Golden Fleece). In 1665 he traveled to Rome to continue his studies at the School of Rome. He moved back and took up residence in Paris, where he fulfilled a number of commissions, primarily religious-themed works for churches, such as for the Saint-Sulpice, Paris.

Mosnier later taught at the Académie de peinture et de sculpture. In 1698 he wrote and published a series of three books on art: History of the Arts associated with Drawing. He died in Paris in 1703.

Work
 1664: La Conquête de la Toison d’Or 
 1665: le Parlement assemblé afin de juger un procès pour le marquis de Locmaviaker
 1674: Hercule se préparant à la défense de la ville de Thèbes, sa patrie, menacée par les Minyens, et recevant d’Apollon des flèches, de Mercure une épée et de Vulcain une cuirasse
 1698: Histoire des arts qui ont raport au dessein (Paris: Pierre Giffart) Digitization of first edition on Gallica
 1699: Notre Seigneur Jésus-Christ, entouré de ses apôtres, appelle à lui les petits enfants

Monier received the Prix de Rome in 1664 for his painting La Conquête de la Toison d’Or. On 6 October 1674, he accepted as an Academician for his painting Hercule se préparant à la défense de la ville de Thèbes, sa patrie, menacée par les Minyens, et recevant d’Apollon des flèches, de Mercure une épée et de Vulcain une cuirasse.

Monier continued to paint until his death in 1703.

References

External links
 

1641 births
1703 deaths
Prix de Rome for painting
17th-century French painters
French male painters
18th-century French painters
18th-century French male artists